(1 April 1908 – 27 February 1987) was a left-wing Japanese documentary and fiction film director.

Biography
Kamei went to the Soviet Union in 1928 to study filmmaking, but had to return home because of an illness. He eventually began working at Photo Chemical Laboratories (PCL), one of the precursors to Toho, where he made a name for himself making documentaries - or "culture films" (bunka eiga) as they were called at the time - that were strongly influenced by Soviet montage theory. Many were propaganda films about Japan's war in China, such as Shanghai and Peking, but his Fighting Soldiers (Tatakau heitai) was criticized by authorities as a potentially anti-war film, one police official in fact protesting that "These aren't fighting soldiers, they're tired soldiers!"  The release of the film was blocked, but Fighting Soldiers was later celebrated as one of the masterpieces of Japanese documentary. After making a film about the poet Kobayashi Issa, Kamei was the only Japanese film director arrested for violation of the Peace Preservation Law and became the first filmmaker to lose his license to direct under the 1939 Film Law. After World War II, he resumed filmmaking with  The Japanese Tragedy (Nihon no higeki), a film produced at Nichiei by Akira Iwasaki, which charged Japanese leaders with responsibility for pursuing a disastrous war. The film, however, was eventually banned by Occupation authorities in particular for its critical depiction of Emperor Hirohito. Kamei thus had films banned by both the Japanese government and the American Occupation forces. Kamei also made fiction films such as War and Peace (Sensō to heiwa), co-directed with Satsuo Yamamoto, but he primarily continued to produce independent documentaries protesting such issues as American bases in Japan, the nuclear bomb, discrimination against burakumin in Japan, and environmental destruction.

Selected filmography

 Shanghai (上海) (1937)
 Peking (北京) (1938)
 Fighting Soldiers (戦ふ兵隊　Tatakau heitai) (1938)
 Kobayashi Issa (小林一茶) (1941)
 The Japanese Tragedy (日本の悲劇 Nihon no higeki) (1946)
 War and Peace (戦争と平和 Sensō to heiwa) (1947)
 It's Good to Live (生きていてよかった Ikite ite yokatta) (1956)
 Record of Blood: Sunagawa (流血の記録　砂川 Ryūketsu no kiroku: Sunagawa) (1957)
 Men Are All Brothers (人間みな兄弟　Ningen mina kyodai) (1960)

References

Further reading

External links
 

1908 births
1987 deaths
Japanese documentary film directors
Place of birth missing